Dirty soda is a drink consisting of soda "spiked" with cream and flavored syrups or fruit juices. The drink has been described as "alcohol-free mocktails with optional flavor, cream and fruit add-ins".

The dirty soda became popular in the mountain states region of the United States in the 2010s, and in the 2020s began to expand to a national consumer base. Dirty sodas are often sold at drive-through restaurants.

Two Utah companies, one based in the Salt Lake Valley and the other based in St. George, were engaged in a lawsuit over who owned the "dirty soda" concept; the suit ended in 2017 with a settlement.

See also
Ice cream soda

References

Sources

Soft drinks
Utah cuisine